Emmanuel "Manu" Kouadio Koné (born 17 May 2001) is a French professional footballer who plays as a midfielder for Bundesliga club Borussia Mönchengladbach.

Club career

Toulouse
Koné made his professional debut for Toulouse in a 2–1 loss to Dijon on 24 May 2019.

Borussia Mönchengladbach
On 21 January 2021, Borussia Mönchengladbach announced the signing of Koné on a deal running until 2025, while also confirming that he would finish the 2020–21 season at Toulouse.

Koné scored his first goal for Gladbach in a 5–0 DFB-Pokal win over Bayern Munich on 27 October 2021.

International career 
Koné is a youth international for France. He has competed at U18 and U19 level.

Personal life
Born in France, Koné is of Ivorian descent.

Career statistics

References

External links
 
 
 
 Kouadio Koné at Toulouse FC 
 Kouadio Koné at LesViolets.com 
 

2001 births
Living people
French footballers
Sportspeople from Colombes
French sportspeople of Ivorian descent
Association football midfielders
Paris FC players
AC Boulogne-Billancourt players
Toulouse FC players
Borussia Mönchengladbach players
Championnat National 3 players
Ligue 1 players
Ligue 2 players
Bundesliga players

France youth international footballers